Executor is a software application that allows Motorola 68000-based classic Mac OS programs to be run on various x86-based operating systems. Executor was created by ARDI (Abacus Research and Development, Inc.). As of 2005, Executor development has been indefinitely postponed; as of 2008, it was made available as open source software.

Overview
Unlike other true Macintosh emulators, Executor requires no startup ROM images or other Apple intellectual property. Executor, much like Wine for running Windows applications on Unix-like platforms, translates Macintosh Toolbox API calls and QuickDraw routines into equivalent Win32 or POSIX API calls. The MS-DOS version of Executor runs using the CWSDPMI protected mode DOS extender.

Executor translates 68k big-endian binary code into x86 little-endian binary code. Executor can only run Macintosh programs designed to run on 68000-based Macintosh hardware. Executor can mimic either Macintosh System 7.0.0, or System 6.0.7 for older applications that are incompatible with System 7.0.0.

Due to the GUI-oriented nature of classic Mac OS applications, Executor has its own GUI environment known as Browser. Browser attempts to somewhat mimic the classic Mac OS desktop and the Finder application without having features such as the trash can or Mac OS control panels. The default Apple menu also does not exist in Browser but is replaced with a rough equivalent; running Mac applications will have Apple menu functions available. Executor does not have support for networking of any type, including AppleTalk support. Executor also lacks the ability to run components (such as extensions or control panels) that are highly integrated with classic Mac OS versions. Due to the differences between the actual MacOS ROM and the emulation provided by Executor, other compatibility issues exist. For example, heise Magazine reports issues with installation of many programs, and running early versions of StarWriter and Adobe PageMill. However, once installed, Microsoft Word, Excel and BBEdit Lite are usable.

Executor can run on x86-based PCs running Microsoft Windows and various specific Linux distributions. All versions of Executor require a minimum configuration of a 90 MHz Pentium processor, 32 MB of RAM with 4 MB available to Executor, and a minimum of 8 MB of hard drive space for installation.
However, the Unofficial Macintosh Emulation Pages reports successfully running Executor with 24MB of RAM on Windows 95.

The Linux version of Executor has been tested under Red Hat Linux 5 through 7, SuSE 6, Caldera OpenLinux 2, Debian 2.1, and Yellow Dog Linux.

Older versions of Executor also run on MS-DOS and NeXTSTEP. Executor was originally developed to run Mac programs on the NextStep platform  and other MC680x0-based Unix systems like SunStation. During that time, two other similar products also existed for Unix systems: Liken from Xcelerated Systems Inc, and Equal from Quorum Inc.

Current status
Currently, Executor isn't being supported or developed. Clifford Matthews, ARDI's founder, released serial codes that worked until December 31, 2006, and again until the end of June 2007. On July 23, 2007, a new working serial code with no expiration date was released, while the status of Executor remains unchanged.

After considering an open source release of the source code for some time, Matthews released the source code for the executor and syn68k applications on October 5, 2008, under a very permissive MIT-style license.

References

External links
ARDI - Executor website
GitHub - Executor project site
Unofficial Mac Emulation: Executor/DOS under Win32
E-Maculation's Executor setup guide
Executor 2000 (actively maintained fork)

Compatibility layers
Classic Mac OS